Zhu Yongqiang (died 27 May 1989) was a Chinese footballer. He competed in the men's tournament at the 1948 Summer Olympics.

References

External links
 

Year of birth missing
1989 deaths
Chinese footballers
China international footballers
Olympic footballers of China
Footballers at the 1948 Summer Olympics
Place of birth missing
Association football forwards